During the 1995–96 English football season, Blackburn Rovers F.C. competed in the FA Premier League (known as the FA Carling Premiership for sponsorship reasons).

Season summary
Blackburn had a disappointing title defence in the Premier League, dropping to 7th in the standings in the wake of Kenny Dalglish's resignation as manager. Their first half of the season was little short of disastrous, their 5–0 defeat at struggling Coventry City in mid December being their eighth in the league, with relegation a distinct possibility. However, Blackburn improved in the second half of the season, losing just five more games and only narrowly missing out on a UEFA Cup place.

They also got knocked out of the Champions League already in the group stage against comparatively unknown Rosenborg and Legia Warsaw. Compounding the misery was the sale of fan favourite and top scorer Alan Shearer, who went to Newcastle for a British transfer record at the end of July.

Final league table

Results summary

Results by round

Results
Blackburn Rovers' score comes first

Legend

FA Premier League

FA Charity Shield

FA Cup

League Cup

UEFA Champions League

Squad

Left club during season

Reserve squad

Transfers

In

Out

Transfers in:  £5,750,000
Transfers out:  £1,050,000
Total spending:  £4,700,000

Statistics

Appearances and goals

|-
! colspan=14 style=background:#dcdcdc; text-align:center| Goalkeepers

|-
! colspan=14 style=background:#dcdcdc; text-align:center| Defenders

|-
! colspan=14 style=background:#dcdcdc; text-align:center| Midfielders

|-
! colspan=14 style=background:#dcdcdc; text-align:center| Forwards

|-
! colspan=14 style=background:#dcdcdc; text-align:center| Players transferred out during the season

Starting 11
Only considering Premier League starts
 GK: #1,  Tim Flowers, 37
 RB: #20,  Henning Berg, 38
 CB: #5,  Colin Hendry, 33
 CB: #2,  Chris Coleman, 19
 LB: #3,  Jeff Kenna, 32
 RM: #7,  Stuart Ripley, 28
 CM: #23,  David Batty, 23
 CM: #4,  Tim Sherwood, 33
 LM: #22,  Lars Bohinen, 17
 CF: #9,  Alan Shearer, 35
 CF: #10,  Mike Newell, 25

References

Blackburn Rovers F.C. seasons
Blackburn Rovers